Americium-241 (Am-241) is an isotope of americium. It is commonly found in ionization type smoke detectors and is a potential fuel for long-lifetime radioisotope thermoelectric generators (RTGs). It is commonly found in the form of americium-241 dioxide. The presence of americium-241 in plutonium is determined by the original concentration of plutonium-241 and the sample age. Because of the low penetration of alpha radiation, americium-241 only poses a health risk when ingested or inhaled. A chemical removal of americium-241 from reworked plutonium (e.g. during reworking of plutonium pits) may be required in some cases.

Nucleosynthesis 
Americium-241 has been produced in small quantities in nuclear reactors for decades, and many kilograms of  have been accumulated by now.

Americium-241 is not synthesized directly from uranium – the most common reactor material – but from the plutonium isotope . The latter needs to be produced first, according to the following nuclear process:

 

 

However, this process is rather slow: half of the original amount of  decays to  after about 14 years, and the  amount reaches a maximum after 70 years.

The obtained  can be used for generating heavier americium isotopes by further neutron capture inside a nuclear reactor.

79%:

Decay 
Americium-241 decays mainly via alpha decay, with a weak gamma ray byproduct. The α-decay is shown as follows:

It is written as such (the asterisk denotes an excited nucleus):

The least common (rarest) type of decay for americium-241 is  cluster decay, with a branching ratio of less than 7.4×10−16. It is written as follows:

Applications

Ionization-type smoke detector
Americium-241 is the only synthetic isotope to have found its way into the household, where the most common type of smoke detector (the ionization-type) uses  (americium-241 dioxide) as its source of ionizing radiation. This isotope is preferred over   because it emits 5times more alpha particles and relatively little harmful gamma radiation. The amount of   declines slowly as it decays into neptunium-237, a different transuranic element with a much longer half-life (about ). The radiated alpha particles pass through an ionization chamber, an air-filled space between two electrodes, which allows a small, constant electric current to pass between the capacitor plates due to the radiation ionizing the air space between. Any smoke that enters the chamber blocks/absorbs some of the alpha particles from freely passing through and reduces the ionization and therefore causes a drop in the current. The alarm's circuitry detects this drop in the current and as a result, triggers the piezoelectric buzzer to sound. Compared to the alternative optical smoke detector, the ionization smoke detector is cheaper and can detect particles which are too small to produce significant light scattering. However, it is more prone to false alarms.

Manufacturing process 
The process for making the americium used in the buttons on ionization-type smoke detectors begins with americium dioxide. A backing of silver and a front covering of gold (or an alloy of gold or palladium) are applied to the briquette and sealed by hot forging. The briquette is then processed through several stages of cold rolling to achieve the desired thickness and levels of radiation emission. The sources are punched out of the foil strip. The holder is the housing, which is the majority of what is seen on the button. The thin rim on the holder is rolled over to completely seal the cut edge around the disc.

RTG (radioisotope thermoelectric generator) power generation
As  has a roughly similar half-life to  (432.2 years vs. 87 years), it has been proposed as an active isotope of radioisotope thermoelectric generators, for use in spacecraft. The European Space Agency is working on RTGs based on americium-241 for its space probes as a result of the global shortage of plutonium-238 and easy access to americium-241 in Europe from nuclear waste reprocessing.

Its shielding requirements in an RTG are the second lowest of all possible isotopes: only  requires less. Prototype designs of  RTGs expect 2–2.2 We/kg for 5–50 We RTGs design, putting   RTGs at parity with  RTGs within that power range, as the vast majority of the mass of an RTG is not the isotopes, but the thermoelectrics, radiators, and isotope containment mass.

Neutron source
Oxides of  pressed with beryllium can be very efficient neutron sources, since they emit alpha particles during radioactive decay:

 
Here americium acts as the alpha source, and beryllium produces neutrons owing to its large cross-section for the (α,n) nuclear reaction:
 

The most widespread use of  neutron sources is a neutron probe – a device used to measure the quantity of water present in soil, as well as moisture/density for quality control in highway construction.  neutron sources are also used in well logging applications, as well as in neutron radiography, tomography, and other radiochemical investigations.

Production of other elements 
Americium-241 is sometimes used as a starting material for the production of other transuranic elements and transactinides – for example, neutron bombardment of  yields :

From there, 82.7% of 

82.7% → 

17.3%→ 

 

Furthermore, the element berkelium ( isotope) had been first intentionally produced and identified by bombarding  with alpha particles, in 1949, by the same Berkeley group, using the same  cyclotron that had been used for many previous experiments.

Spectrometer 
Americium-241 has been used as a portable source of both gamma rays and alpha particles for a number of medical and industrial uses. For example, this isotope has been employed to gauge glass thickness to help create flat glass. Americium-241 is also suitable for calibration of gamma-ray spectrometers in the low-energy range, since its spectrum consists of nearly a single peak and negligible Compton continuum (at least three orders of magnitude lower intensity).

Medicine 
Gamma rays from americium-241 have been used to provide passive diagnosis of thyroid function. This medical application is now obsolete. Americium-241's gamma rays can provide reasonable quality radiographs, with a 10-minute exposure time.  radiographs have only been taken experimentally due to the long exposure time which increases the effective dose to living tissue. Reducing exposure duration reduces the chance of ionization events causing damage to cells and DNA, and is a critical component in the "time, distance, shielding" maxim used in radiation protection.

Hazards

Americium-241 has the same general hazards as other americium isotopes: it is both extremely toxic and radioactive. Although α-particles can be stopped by a sheet of paper, there are serious health concerns for ingestion of α-emitters. Americium and its isotopes are also very chemically toxic as well, in the form of heavy-metal toxicity.

Americium-241 is an α-emitter with a weak γ-ray byproduct. Safely handling americium-241 requires knowing and following proper safety precautions, as without them it would be extremely dangerous.

If consumed, americium-241 is excreted within a few days and only 0.05% is absorbed in the blood. From there, roughly 45% of it goes to the liver and 45% to the bones, and the remaining 10% is excreted. The uptake to the liver depends on the individual and increases with age. In the bones, americium is first deposited over cortical and trabecular surfaces and slowly redistributes over the bone with time.

Americium-241 often enters landfills from discarded smoke detectors. The rules associated with the disposal of smoke detectors are relaxed in most jurisdictions. In the U.S., the "Radioactive Boy Scout" David Hahn was able to concentrate americium-241 from smoke detectors after managing to buy a hundred of them at remainder prices and also stealing a few. There have been a few cases of exposure to americium-241, the worst case being that of Harold McCluskey who, at the age of 64, was exposed to 500 times the occupational standard for americium-241 as a result of an explosion in his lab. McCluskey died at the age of 75, not as a result of exposure, but of a heart disease which he had before the accident.

See also
Isotopes of americium

References

Isotopes of americium
Radioisotope fuels